A dual-band blade antenna, is a type of blade antenna, a monopole whip antenna mounted on the outside of an aircraft in the form of a blade-shaped aerodynamic fairing to reduce its air drag. It is used by avionics radio communication systems. The dual band type uses a "plane and slot" design to get efficient omni-directional coverage so that it can operate on two different radio bands.

Introduction 

A typical monopole antenna has an omnidirectional radiation pattern; it radiates equal radio power in all azimuthal directions perpendicular to the antenna axis, with the signal power decreasing with elevation angle to a null (point of zero radiated power) at the zenith.  

A monopole antenna can be thought of as a dipole antenna where one end of the dipole antenna now becomes the ground plane for said monopole antenna. By this line of conceptual thinking, one can easily reach the conclusion that the radiation emanating from a monopole antenna exists in half the space of similar dipole antenna. Therefore, the maximum gain is twice that, or an addition 3 dB, of the maximum gain of typical dipole. Hence the nominal value of maximum for a monopole antenna is about 5.15dBi.

Stutzman puts it succinctly as follows:
... A monopole is a dipole that has been divided in half at its center feed point and fed against a ground plane...

This article covers one type of dual band blade monopoles. This is the slot inside a monopole. Computational Electromagnetic Modeling (CEM) will be used to give some graphics of operations for a more conceptual understanding.

Dual band works in dual mode
it works on the basis of Ohm's Law V=IR
where V=voltage , I=current and R=resistance.

Theory

Monopoles
Monopole equations can be arrived by inspection of dipole antenna derivations with the knowledge that all radiation occurs in half the volume when compared to said dipole antenna. This leads to the following equations:

Directivity

This leads directly to the earlier stated maximum gain relation to a dipole by the definition of gain a  where  is the antenna radiation efficiency.

Impedance

Radiation Resistance

As can be seen in section 1 of the linked radiation resistance article.

Blade Antennas
A blade antenna is an attempt to create a broader band monopole (when compared to a thin wire monopole). Most blade antennas are trapezoidal in shape. Variations have been made on this shape for aerodynamic purposes and notches have been introduced in order to achieve a better broad band performance. This type of monopole antenna is generally used in aviation for VHF and UHF frequency range.

For more information see the Antenna Engineering Handbook.

Slot Antennas
A slot antenna can be viewed as a dipole with opposite polarization. This is due to the typical feed which sets the orientation of the E-field across the smallest linear dimension of the slot. The following equations can be used to 'translate' a vertical or horizontal slot antenna into its complement (dipole):

Where the subscript S denotes the opening on the screen and the subscript C denotes its complement (a dipole). This assumes an unbounded medium. In addition, all of the slot equations assume a screen thickness much less than a wavelength. If these were not held to be true, fringing and the existence of modes could not be ignored.

This is defined by Babinet's principle and Booker's Extension further expands this 
principle to include polarization. The simple equations from Babinet's principle are stated on the linked page for which the author has had input.

Dual Band Antennas
Dual band antennas are not a new idea. For years many manufactures have combined multiple elements to create antennas that operate in two separate bands (do not get this confused with so-called frequency independent antennas such as a log-periodic antenna).

Computational Electromagnetic Modeling (CEM) 
Computational Electromagnetic Modeling (CEM) uses various methods to numerically calculate an antenna pattern.

To the untrained eye, this may seem a trivial process. Although, with some research and thought, one will realize that all local structures affect the radiation pattern either by reflection, absorption, refraction, fringing, or being a part of the radiating structure. Some structure which is not local will also cause these items and more including blockage and 're-radiation'. With this in mind, the calculation can become cumbersome.

Multiple algorithms exist in CEM. These include but are not limited to Method of Moments (MoM), Finite Element Method (FEM), and Uniform Theory of Diffraction (UTD). Two examples of software packages that use these methods in free-space are FEKO and WIPL-D. The examples shown here come from WIPL-D. Please keep in mind, these software packages must be used by someone who understands the process and can decide whether the calculated is real or if an error in the model and input data generated false output data (the old adage of garbage in equals garbage out).

Dual Band Blade Antenna Example
This example will use a design for an approximate frequency for Biomedical Telemetry at 460 MHz and GPS frequency L1 (1575.42 MHz) in a single package (I hesitate to say a single antenna because there are two radiating elements which would require two baluns for matching). Please keep in mind, these are not match to any transmission line. Therefore, the design will not be practical for use. It is only for demonstration purposes.

Below you will see the simple used for the simulations. The ground plane is twice the wavelength at 460 MHz.

Below is a comparison of the horizontal radiation patterns at L1 for both the blade and the slot. The slot exhibits the figure 8 dipole pattern with decent gain. While the blade still radiates, the gain is lower and the pattern is very loby creating nulls. Please note, for a larger image, follow the link in each caption or just click on the image (it will be better quality if you click the image).

One will also note the polarization of the two elements. As stated before, the polarization of the slot is due to its feed which is generally across the smallest linear dimension. Hence, this slot is Horizontally polarized with respect to the ground plane and the blade is vertically polarized with respect to the ground plane.

Here we are seeing the vertically polarized radiation patterns or Vpol for 460 MHz.

Whereas presented here we can see the Hpol radiation pattern for both the blade and slot elements.

Conclusion

By the preceding section, it is seen that a dual band blade antenna can be polarity diverse as well as dual band. The bands chosen for this example are relatively close in frequency and give a poor example of the power of such a device, yet it nicely illustrates what can be completed. Given enough real-estate, one can cover two very diverse bands with good coverage and opposite polarization.

It also clearly illustrates that the impact of the rectangular slot radiating element is negligible on the radiation pattern of the lower frequency monopole. This is due to the previously mentioned rule of thumb stating it is wise to keep the slot smaller than one-tenth the frequency of operation of the blade. Hence, that frequency does not 'see' the slot.

By combining two elements in this manner, one saves costs in manufacturing and saves real-estate in mounting the antenna. It is noteworthy to mention again that each radiating element must have a different feed structure and most likely a different matching network.

References 

Radio frequency antenna types
Antennas (radio)